Kinder Township is one of ten townships in Cape Girardeau County, Missouri, USA.  As of the 2000 census, its population was 999.

History
Kinder Township was founded in 1872. The township has the name of the Kinder family, early settlers.

Geography
It contains six cemeteries: Allen, Calvary, Criddle, Deck, Gravel Hill and McGuire.

The streams of Byrd Creek, Dillard Creek, Little Whitewater Creek, McGuire Branch and Schroder Branch run through this township.

References

 USGS Geographic Names Information System (GNIS)

External links
 US-Counties.com
 City-Data.com

Townships in Cape Girardeau County, Missouri
Cape Girardeau–Jackson metropolitan area
Townships in Missouri